Miguel Ángel Vallejo Navarro (born 3 September 1990) is a Mexican professional footballer.

He is 1.64m tall, and weighs 64 kg. He has played in the Liga MX for Estudiantes Tecos.

References

External links
 

1990 births
Living people
Tecos F.C. footballers
Footballers from Jalisco
Mexican footballers
Association football forwards
People from Ciudad Guzmán, Jalisco
Liga MX players
Ascenso MX players
Liga de Expansión MX players